The Military Music Center of the Bundeswehr is the office in charge of managing the military bands of the Bundeswehr. It was established on 25 August 2009 as part of a restructuring of the Bundeswehr, to replace the specialist branch of service that existed for military musicians before it.

Order

The Central Task of The Center, is the functional management of all Ensembles of the Bundeswehr as well as the expert advice of the Ministry of Defence(MoD)in Military Music Matters. In addition, controls and plans to the stakes of all Bundeswehr Units, both domestically and abroad. It is also responsible for Approving the Music Production by Members of the Armed Forces.

References 
 

Bundeswehr
German military bands
Joint Support Service (Germany)